Marmaduke Percy Conway, FRCO, ARCM (1885–1961), was an English organist and writer.

Education
Conway was educated at Bedford School and the Royal College of Music, obtaining a B.Mus in Oxford and a Mus.D in Dublin.

Organist
He later became Organist of All Saints', Eastbourne in 1908, and St. Andrew's, Wells Street, London, in 1917. Four years as Assistant Organist of Wells Cathedral led him to Chichester. In 1931 he left Chichester to become Organist of Ely Cathedral. He retired in 1949. It was during Conway's time as Organist of Chichester Cathedral that an electric blowing apparatus was provided for the Cathedral organ. The blower was housed in the room off the north transept, now known as the Plant Room, and the wind was conveyed through to the organ via an underground conduit still in existence.

Author
He was an accomplished author of books and articles on organ technique.

 Playing a Church Organ (1949) London: Latimer House Ltd

References

1885 births
1961 deaths
Alumni of the Royal College of Music
English organists
British male organists
Organists & Masters of the Choristers of Chichester Cathedral
Fellows of the Royal College of Organists
People educated at Bedford School
Organists of Ely Cathedral
20th-century organists
20th-century British male musicians
20th-century classical musicians
Male classical organists